The 2005 National Rugby League season consisted of 25 weekly regular season rounds starting in March, followed by four weeks of play-offs that culminated in a grand final on 2 October.

Regular season

Round 1

Round 2

Round 3

Round 4

Round 5

Round 6

Finals series 
The National Rugby League's 2005 finals series ran from 9 September to 2 October 2005, as eight teams vied to win the NRL Premiership in the Grand Final after the 2005 season. The final placings and first-week match-ups were decided only after all the matches in the final week were completed. The Grand Final, played on 2 October, was won by the Wests Tigers who claimed their first-ever NRL premiership. The runners up were the North Queensland Cowboys.

The Finals System 
The system used for the NRL is the McIntyre final eight system, which is designed by Ken McIntyre in addition to the McIntyre Four, Five and Six systems to determine which two teams will play for the Premiership. In each of the three weeks of the competition, two teams are eliminated until only two teams are left. The better a team finishes in the home-and-away season ladder, the easier their route through to the grand final.

In the first week, twos are paired off as such by rank (games are played at the home ground of the higher seed):

 Team 4 vs. Team 5 (1st qualifying final)
 Team 3 vs. Team 6 (2nd qualifying final)
 Team 2 vs. Team 7 (3rd qualifying final)
 Team 1 vs. Team 8 (4th qualifying final)

Once all four games ave been played, teams are grouped into winners and losers, and then ranked based on their home-and-away season standings, for example:

...Losers #3 and #4 are immediately eliminated, while Winners #3 and #4 will face Losers #1 and #2 (in other words, a "double chance" for the two highest-ranked losers). Winners #1 and #2 receive a bye to week three, to await the winners of the two semi-finals.

The winners of the two preliminary finals will then face off for the premiership in the grand final.

Week One

First Qualifying Final

Second Qualifying Final

Third Qualifying Final

Fourth Qualifying Final

Week Two

First Semi-final

Second Semi-final

Week Three

First Preliminary Final

Second Preliminary Final

2005 NRL Grand Final

References 

Results
National Rugby League season results